Beatty is a surname of Scottish and Irish origin. In some cases from Bartholomew, which was often shortened to Bate or Baty. Male descendants were then often called Beatty, or similar derivations like Beattie or Beatey. The name Beatty or Beattie, others think, arose in Ireland from Betagh, a surname meaning hospitaller. A majority of people named Beatty or Beattie in Ireland are the descendants of Scots who came over to Ulster in the seventeenth century. Beattie is common in counties Antrim and Down, whilst Beatty is more common in counties Armagh and Tyrone. In Fermanagh in 1962, Beatty was the fifteenth most common name and was recorded as synonymous with the names Betty and MacCaffrey (or McCaffrey).

It is most likely that the name derives from Mac a'Bhiadhtaigh, from biadhtach, "one who held land on condition of supplying food (biad) to those billeted on him by the chief". In the rest of Ireland, the name Biadhtach (Betagh; "public victualler") was changed to Beatty or Beattie.   In Scotland, the Beatties were a reiver clan in the Langholm area of Eskdale. George MacDonald Fraser has written about the reiving clans in "The Steel Bonnets : The Story of the Anglo-Scottish Border Reivers".

An Irish origin of the name Beattie is supported specifically by the Irish-specific marker S169 which is most common in Leinster, Ireland, but also "found in Scotland, especially among men with the surnames of Beattie and Ferguson".

Notable people with the surname include:

 Alfred Chester Beatty (1875-1968), collector of Chinese and Japanese art
 Andrew Beatty (born 1980), Northern Irish journalist and editor
 Beatty (Fahrenheit 451), fictional character from the novel Fahrenheit 451
 Bob Beatty, American football coach
 Bruce W. Beatty, Canadian graphic designer
 Chris Beatty (born 1973), American football coach
 Chuck Beatty (born 1946), former American football player and Texas mayor
 Clyde Beatty (1903-1965), American trainer of wild animals and circus performer
 David Beatty, 1st Earl Beatty (1871-1936), British Admiral at the Battle of Jutland
 David Beatty, 2nd Earl Beatty (1905-1972), British politician
 David L. Beatty (1798-1881), fifth mayor of Louisville, Kentucky
 David R. Beatty (born 1942), Canadian businessman
 Edward Wentworth Beatty (1877-1943), Canadian lawyer and university chancellor
 George Beatty (judge), judge and former politician in the Canadian province of Ontario
 George William Beatty (1887–1955), pioneer aviator who set early altitude and distance records
 James Beatty (engineer) (1820-1856), Irish railway engineer
 Jim Beatty (born 1934), American former athlete
 Jerome Beatty Jr. (1916-2002), children's author of the Matthew Looney books
 John William Beatty (1869-1941), Canadian painter
 John Beatty (1922-1975), part of duo John and Patricia Beatty, American writers of children books
 John Beatty (Ohio banker) (1828-1914), American Civil War general
 John Beatty (Continental Congress) (1749-1826), American physician and statesman
 John Beatty (illustrator) (born 1961), American illustrator
 John Beatty (philosopher) (born 1951), Canadian philosopher
 Joyce Beatty (born 1950), American politician
 Laura Beatty (born 1963), English author
 Linda Beatty (born 1952), American actress
 Maria Beatty (fl. 1980s–2010s), American film director, producer and actress
 Mike Beatty (fl. 1990s–2010s), American politician
 Nancy Beatty (fl. 1970s–2010s), Canadian actress
 Ned Beatty (1937–2021), American actor
 Otto Beatty Jr. (1940-2021), American lawyer and politician
 Patricia Beatty (1922-1991), part of duo John and Patricia Beatty, American writers of children books
 Paul Beatty (born 1962), African-American author
 Perrin Beatty (born 1950), Canadian politician
 Peter Beatty (1910–1949)
 Richmond C. Beatty (1905-1961), American academic, biographer and critic 
 Robert Beatty (1909-1992), Canadian actor
 Robert Beatty (artist) (born 1981), American musician and artist
 Ryan Beatty (born 1995), American singer
 Samuel Beatty (general) (1820-1885), American Civil War general
 Scott Beatty, American author
 Terry Beatty (born 1958), American comic book artist
 Tracey Beatty (born 1979), Australian basketball player
 Vander L. Beatty (1941–1990), American politician
 Virginia H. Beatty, birth name of Gertrude Franklin (1858-1913), American singer and music educator
 Warren Beatty (born 1937), American actor
 William Beatty (surgeon) (1773-1842), British Navy surgeon serving with Lord Nelson
 William Beatty (Ontario politician) (1835-1898), Canadian businessman and politician
 William H. Beatty (1838-1914), Chief Justice of the Nevada Supreme Court, and later of the California Supreme Court

See also
 Beaty, surname
 Beattie (surname)
 Batey (surname)
 Justice Beatty (disambiguation)

References